The 2010 WNBA season was the 14th season for the Phoenix Mercury of the Women's National Basketball Association.

Transactions

Dispersal draft
Based on the Mercury's 2009 record, they would pick 12th in the Sacramento Monarchs dispersal draft. The Mercury waived their pick.

WNBA Draft
The following are the Mercury's selections in the 2010 WNBA Draft.

Transaction log
March 26, 2009: The Mercury traded their first round pick in the 2010 draft to the Los Angeles Sparks in return for Temeka Johnson.
February 9: The Mercury signed Brooke Smith to a training camp contract.
February 26: The Mercury signed Ashley Paris to a training camp contract.
March 17: The Mercury signed Lanae Williams to a training camp contract.
March 30: The Mercury traded Cappie Pondexter and Kelly Mazzante to the New York Liberty in exchange for Candice Dupree from the Chicago Sky, as part of a three-team trade.
April 16: The Mercury re-signed Penny Taylor and Temeka Johnson.
May 3: The Mercury waived Tyra Grant.
May 11: The Mercury waived Nyeshia Stevenson and Ashley Paris.
May 13: The Mercury waived Lanae Williams and Yuko Oga.
July 23: The Mercury traded Nicole Ohlde and a first-round pick in the 2011 Draft to the Tulsa Shock in exchange for Kara Braxton.

Trades

Free agents

Additions

Subtractions

Roster

Depth

Season standings

Schedule

Preseason

|- align="center" bgcolor="ffbbbb"
| 1 || May 2 || 4:00pm || @ Seattle || 58-77 || Williams (19) || Paris (9) || Stevenson, Williams (2) || KeyArena  4,912 || 0-1
|- align="center" bgcolor="bbffbb"
| 2 || May 8 || 10:00pm || China National Team || 106-78 || Johnson (21) || Bonner (7) || Swanier (7) || US Airways Center  2,393 || 1-1
|-

Regular season

|- align="center" bgcolor="bbffbb"
| 1 || May 15 || 2:00pm || Los Angeles || ESPN2 || 78-77 || Dupree (17) || Dupree (10) || Taurasi, Johnson (3) || US Airways Center  14,772  || 1-0
|- align="center" bgcolor="ffbbbb"
| 2 || May 22 || 10:00pm || Seattle ||  || 89-95 (OT) || Bonner (24) || Bonner (12) || Johnson, Taylor (5) || US Airways Center  10,144 || 1-1
|- align="center" bgcolor="bbffbb"
| 3 || May 25 || 7:00pm || @ Tulsa || ESPN2 || 110-96 || Taurasi (35) || Dupree (14) || Taylor (7) || BOK Center  4,100 || 2-1
|- align="center" bgcolor="ffbbbb"
| 4 || May 28 || 10:00pm || Atlanta ||  || 93-96 || Taurasi (30) || Bonner (13) || Taylor (7) || US Airways Center  7,986 || 2-2
|-

|- align="center" bgcolor="ffbbbb"
| 5 || June 1 || 7:30pm || @ Minnesota || ESPN2 || 82-92 || Taurasi (21) || Dupree (9) || Johnson (5) || Target Center  6,854 || 2-3
|- align="center" bgcolor="bbffbb"
| 6 || June 4 || 10:00pm || Los Angeles ||  || 90-89 || Bonner (24) || Dupree (8) || Johnson (5) || US Airways Center  6,485 || 3-3
|- align="center" bgcolor="ffbbbb"
| 7 || June 6 || 9:00pm || @ Seattle || KONG || 74-97 || Bonner (12) || T. Smith (8) || Taylor (6) || KeyArena  7,827 || 3-4
|- align="center" bgcolor="ffbbbb"
| 8 || June 8 || 10:30pm || @ Los Angeles || PRIME || 91-92 || Taurasi (21) || T. Smith (9) || Johnson, Taylor (9) || STAPLES Center  7,993 || 3-5
|- align="center" bgcolor="bbffbb"
| 9 || June 10 || 10:00pm || Minnesota || FS-A || 99-88 || Taurasi (31) || Dupree (8) || Johnson (8) || US Airways Center  5,504 || 4-5
|- align="center" bgcolor="bbffbb"
| 10 || June 12 || 10:00pm || Tulsa ||  || 116-84 || Dupree, Taurasi (18) || Bonner (7) || Taylor (8) || US Airways Center  6,580 || 5-5
|- align="center" bgcolor="ffbbbb"
| 11 || June 18 || 10:00pm || San Antonio ||  || 105-108 || Taurasi (39) || Dupree (11) || Johnson, Taurasi (7) || US Airways Center  6,147 || 5-6
|- align="center" bgcolor="ffbbbb"
| 12 || June 20 || 6:00pm || Connecticut || NBATVFS-A || 94-96 || Taurasi (24) || Ohlde (7) || Taylor (4) || US Airways Center  6,068 || 5-7
|- align="center" bgcolor="ffbbbb"
| 13 || June 25 || 7:30pm || @ Connecticut || CSN-NE || 79-82 || Taurasi (26) || Bonner (10) || Taurasi (6) || Mohegan Sun Arena  9,518 || 5-8
|- align="center" bgcolor="ffbbbb"
| 14 || June 27 || 4:00pm || @ Washington || NBATVCSN-MA || 85-95 || Taurasi (18) || Dupree (9) || Taurasi (4) || Verizon Center  7,547 || 5-9
|- align="center" bgcolor="ffbbbb"
| 15 || June 29 || 7:00pm || @ Atlanta || SSO || 88-94 || Taylor (31) || Bonner (9) || Johnson (12) || Philips Arena  4,073 || 5-10
|-

|- align="center" bgcolor="ffbbbb"
| 16 || July 1 || 10:00pm || Washington || FS-A || 104-107 || Dupree, Taylor (23) || Dupree (9) || Johnson (11) || US Airways Center  5,509 || 5-11
|- align="center" bgcolor="bbffbb"
| 17 || July 3 || 10:00pm || New York ||  || 97-82 || Dupree (24) || T. Smith (10) || Taurasi (5) || US Airways Center  6,780 || 6-11
|- align="center" bgcolor="bbffbb"
| 18 || July 6 || 10:00pm || @ Los Angeles || ESPN2 || 98-89 || Taurasi (30) || Dupree (12) || Taurasi (7) || STAPLES Center  8,336 || 7-11
|- align="center" bgcolor="ffbbbb"
| 19 || July 14 || 3:30pm || Seattle || FS-A || 107-111 (3OT) || Taurasi (44) || Dupree (14) || Taruasi, Taylor (4) || US Airways Center  13,508 || 7-12
|- align="center" bgcolor="bbffbb"
| 20 || July 17 || 10:00pm || Tulsa ||  || 97-88 || Taylor (29) || Taurasi (7) || Taurasi (8) || US Airways Center  8,564 || 8-12
|- align="center" bgcolor="bbffbb"
| 21 || July 22 || 8:00pm || @ Tulsa || COX || 123-91 || Taurasi (26) || Bonner (7) || Johnson (7) || BOK Center  3,333 || 9-12
|- align="center" bgcolor="bbffbb"
| 22 || July 24 || 8:00pm || @ Minnesota || NBATVFS-N || 127-124 (2OT) || Dupree (32) || Dupree (16) || Johnson (9) || Target Center  8,518 || 10-12
|- align="center" bgcolor="ffbbbb"
| 23 || July 27 || 9:30pm || @ Seattle || ESPN2 || 85-91 || Taurasi (27) || Taylor (7) || Taurasi, Taylor (6) || KeyArena  8,044 || 10-13
|- align="center" bgcolor="bbffbb"
| 24 || July 29 || 10:00pm || Minnesota ||  || 110-92 || Taylor (22) || Dupree, T. Smith (8) || Johnson (8) || US Airways Center  7,037 || 11-13
|-

|- align="center" bgcolor="bbffbb"
| 25 || August 1 || 6:00pm || Chicago || NBATVFS-ACN100 || 97-96 || Taurasi (35) || Bonner, Braxton, Dupree (6) || Taurasi (11) || US Airways Center  11,237 || 12-13
|- align="center" bgcolor="bbffbb"
| 26 || August 3 || 8:00pm || @ San Antonio ||  || 103-92 || Dupree (24) || Dupree (12) || Taurasi (10) || AT&T Center  6,116 || 13-13
|- align="center" bgcolor="bbffbb"
| 27 || August 6 || 10:00pm || San Antonio ||  || 103-87 || T. Smith, Taylor (18) || Braxton (7) || Taylor (8) || US Airways Center  12,909 || 14-13
|- align="center" bgcolor="ffbbbb"
| 28 || August 8 || 6:00pm || Indiana ||  || 82-104 || Taurasi (21) || Dupree (6) || Taurasi (7) || US Airways Center  10,995 || 14-14
|- align="center" bgcolor="ffbbbb"
| 29 || August 10 || 8:00pm || @ Chicago ||  || 82-91 || Taurasi (28) || T. Smith (10) || Taylor (7) || Allstate Arena  4,089 || 14-15
|- align="center" bgcolor="ffbbbb"
| 30 || August 13 || 7:00pm || @ Indiana ||  || 90-110 || Johnson (23) || Braxton, Taylor (6) || Taurasi (4) || Conseco Fieldhouse  10,002 || 14-16
|- align="center" bgcolor="ffbbbb"
| 31 || August 14 || 7:30pm || @ New York || NBATVMSG || 69-107 || Bonner (20) || Braxton, Dupree (8) || Johnson (4) || Madison Square Garden  9,645 || 14-17
|- align="center" bgcolor="bbffbb"
| 32 || August 17 || 10:30pm || @ Los Angeles || NBATVPRIME || 90-84 || Braxton (16) || Dupree, Taylor (11) || Taylor (7) || STAPLES Center  8,817 || 15-17
|- align="center" bgcolor="ffbbbb"
| 33 || August 20 || 7:00pm || Seattle ||  || 71-78 || Braxton (15) || Bonner (7) || Bonner (4) || US Airways Center  12,459 || 15-18
|- align="center" bgcolor="ffbbbb"
| 34 || August 22 || 3:00pm || @ San Antonio ||  || 82-83 || Bonner (20) || Bonner (12) || Bonner, Lilley, Swanier (3) || AT&T Center  8,331 || 15-19
|-

| All games are viewable on WNBA LiveAccess

Postseason

|- align="center" bgcolor="bbffbb"
| 1 || August 26 || 9:00pm || San Antonio || ESPN2 || 106-93 || Dupree (32) || Dupree (8) || Taurasi (10) || US Airways Center  8,927 || 1-0 
|- align="center" bgcolor="bbffbb"
| 2 || August 28 || 1:00pm || @ San Antonio || ESPN2 || 92-73 || Taurasi (23) || Dupree (11) || Taylor (12) || AT&T Center  6,763 || 2-0
|-

|- align="center" bgcolor="ffbbbb"
| 1 || September 2 || 10:00pm || @ Seattle || NBATV || 74-82 || Taylor (16) || Dupree (11) || Johnson (7) || KeyArena  9,686 || 0-1 
|- align="center" bgcolor="ffbbbb"
| 2 || September 5 || 3:00pm || Seattle || ABC || 88-91 || Taurasi (28) || T. Smith (7) || Johnson (12) || US Airways Center  9,010 || 0-2 
|-

Statistics

Regular season

Awards and honors
Diana Taurasi was named WNBA Western Conference Player of the Week for the week of June 5, 2010.
Candice Dupree was named WNBA Western Conference Player of the Week for the week of July 3, 2010.
Diana Taurasi was named WNBA Western Conference Player of the Week for the week of July 17, 2010.
Diana Taurasi was named WNBA Western Conference Player of the Week for the week of July 24, 2010.
Candice Dupree was named to the 2010 WNBA All-Star Team as a Team USA reserve.
Diana Taurasi was named to the 2010 WNBA All-Star Team as a Team USA starter.
Penny Taylor was named to the 2010 WNBA All-Star Team as a WNBA reserve.
Diana Taurasi was named to the All-WNBA First Team.

References

External links

Phoenix Mercury seasons
Phoenix
Phoenix Mercury